The Order of Friendship (Dostyq ordeni) is a state award of the Republic of Kazakhstan, introduced in 1995. It is awarded to individuals for the promotion of international and civil consensus in society and the promotion of peace, friendship and cooperation between peoples.

The ribbon is red with two narrow yellow central stripes and a green edge and a blue edge. The award has two classes. Recipients of the 1st class receive a star badge and the decoration symbol fitted with a shoulder ribbon. Recipients of the 2nd class receive a medal.

Recipients

 Recep Tayyip Erdoğan, President of Turkey (2022)
 Elena Rybakina (2022)
 Sergei Tsyrulnikov (2022)
 Igor Krutoy (2019)
 Javad Zarif (2018)
 Tomislav Nikolić (2016)
 Francois Hollande (2015)
 Kirk Tinsley (2010)
 Valdas Adamkus (2000)
 Alexy II of Moscow
 Ban Ki-moon
 Nikolay Bordyuzha
 Yury Glazkov
 Viktor Khristenko
 Hüseyin Kıvrıkoğlu
 Joseph Kobzon
 Sergey Lavrov
 Lee Kuan Yew
 Anatoly Perminov
 Leonid Polezhayev
 Yevgeny Primakov
 Eduard Rossel
 Viktor Sadovnichiy
 Mintimer Shaimiev
 Tang Jiaxuan
 Anatoly Torkunov
 Zhang Deguang
 Mikhail Kalashnikov
 Irina Bokova
 Aleksandar Vučić
 Ben van Beurden

See also
Orders, decorations, and medals of Kazakhstan

References

External links
 Republic of Kazakhstan: Order of Friendship

Orders, decorations, and medals of Kazakhstan
Awards established in 1995